Carlos Torres (1929–2011) was a Chilean astronomer of the University of Chile and an individual member of the International Astronomical Union on several commissions. Between 1968 and 1982, he discovered or co-discovered a number of asteroids from the University of Chile's Cerro El Roble Astronomical Station. Together with Spanish astronomer Carlos Guillermo Torres (1910–1965), he was honored with the naming of asteroid 1769 Carlostorres.

List of discovered minor planets

Selected publications 
Herbert Wroblewski Cruz, C. Torres, and S. Barros, Minor Planet Positions, Publicaciones Departmento de Astronomia Universidad de Chile, Vol. II, No. 7, pp. 215–244, (1977)
H. Wroblewski, C. Torres, S. Barros, and Marina Wischnjewsky, Minor planet positions obtained at Cerro Calan Observatory during 1978-1980, Astronomy and Astrophysics Supplement Series, vol. 51, pp. 93–95 (January 1983)
H. Wroblewski, and C. Torres, New proper-motion stars south of declination -40 deg and right ascension between 00 H and 04 H 30 M, Astronomy and Astrophysics Supplement Series, vol. 78, no. 2, pp. 231–247 (May 1989)
H. Wroblewski and C. Torres, New proper motion determination of Luyten catalogue stars (LTT) south of declination -40 degrees and right ascension between 00 H and 04 H 30 M, Astronomy and Astrophysics Supplement Series, vol. 83, no. 2, pp. 317–329 (May 1990)
H. Wroblewski and C. Torres, New proper-motion stars south of declination -40 deg and right ascension between 04h 30m and 16h 00m, Astronomy and Astrophysics Supplement Series, vol. 91, no. 1, pp. 129–169 (November 1991)
H. Wroblewski and C. Torres, New proper motion determination of Luyten catalogue stars (LTT) south of declination -40 deg and right ascension between 04 H 30 M and 16 H 00 M, Astronomy and Astrophysics Supplement Series, vol. 92, no. 3, pp. 449–472 (February 1992)
H. Wroblewski and C. Torres, Proper motion LTT stars -5<DE<-30, 0<RA<13h30, VizieR On-line Data Catalog: J/A+AS/128/457

References

External links 
 Carlos Torres, individual Member at the IAU

1929 births
2011 deaths
20th-century astronomers
Chilean astronomers
Discoverers of asteroids